Yucca School District 13 is a public school district based in Mohave County, Arizona.

External links

School districts in Mohave County, Arizona